Armin Franulic (8 September 1943 – 19 June 2021) was a Bolivian rally driver.

Biography
Franulic made his debut at the age of 33 on 21 August 1976 at the Gran Premio Nacional de Torino in Argentina, which he would withdraw from. He then earned second place in the event each year from 1977 to 1981.

Franulic also participated in four World Rally Championship events and the Pikes Peak International Hill Climb in 1991.

Armin Franulic died on 19 June 2021 at the age of 77.

Awards
Runner-up in the Codasur South American Rally Championship (1999)
Champion of Bolivia (1984, 1985, 1986, 1987, 1988, 1992, 1995, 2007)

References

1943 births
2021 deaths
Bolivian rally drivers
World Rally Championship drivers
Sportspeople from La Paz